Catherine Byrne (born March 27, 1964) is an American politician from the state of Nevada. She was elected Controller of Nevada on November 6, 2018, defeating Republican incumbent Ron Knecht with 50.58% of the votes. She is a certified public accountant and graduated from California Lutheran University. Byrne did not run for reelection.

References

External links
Government website
Campaign website

1964 births
California Lutheran University alumni
Living people
Nevada Democrats
Politicians from Carson City, Nevada
Politicians from Las Vegas
State Controllers of Nevada